Erindale Secondary School is a secondary School of the Peel District School Board serving the Erindale community of Western Mississauga, Ontario.

Special programs 
Erindale offers the International Baccalaureate (IB) program and cooperative education.

Notable alumni
 Kevin Kain, tropical disease expert based at the Toronto General Hospital
 Dave Poulin, former NHL centre
 Mike Bullard, television personality
 Pat Bullard, comedian
 Christine Magee (née Bishop) (Sleep Country Canada)
 Kevin Newman, news anchor for CTV television network
 Brian Hayward, former NHL goaltender and current colour analyst for the Anaheim Ducks
 John Roberts, FOX news reporter
 Jamal Mayers, professional hockey player with the Chicago Blackhawks
 Sterling Hinds, Canadian Olympic sprinter and former CFL player
 Rob Pike, senior scientist for Google, Inc.
 Martin Streek (d. 2009), radio personality
 Dwight Edwards, professional football player for the Toronto Argonauts, Mississauga Sports Hall of Fame 2000
 Robert Tibshirani, professor of statistics at Stanford University
 Lauren Toyota, Canadian television personality
 Thomas McBroom, Canadian golf course architect
 Casey Cizikas, NHL player for the New York Islanders (did not actually graduate from erindale but did attend)
 Karen Preston, former Olympian and two-time Canadian figure skating champion
 Shawn Matthias, former NHL forward

See also
List of high schools in Ontario

References

External links
Erindale Secondary School

Peel District School Board
High schools in Mississauga
Educational institutions established in 1968
1968 establishments in Ontario
International Baccalaureate schools in Ontario